Eilema interpositella is a moth of the subfamily Arctiinae. It was described by Embrik Strand in 1920. It is found in North Africa and on the Iberian Peninsula.

References

interpositella
Moths described in 1920